The North of Ireland Operative Butchers' and Allied Workers' Association was a trade union in the United Kingdom. It merged with the Transport and General Workers' Union in 1965.

See also
 List of trade unions
 Transport and General Workers' Union
 TGWU amalgamations

References
Arthur Ivor Marsh, Victoria Ryan. Historical Directory of Trade Unions, Volume 5 Ashgate Publishing, Ltd., Jan 1, 2006 pg. 436

Defunct trade unions of Ireland
Meat industry trade unions
Meat processing in the United Kingdom
Trade unions disestablished in 1965
Trade unions in Northern Ireland
Transport and General Workers' Union amalgamations